Michel Havard (born March 24, 1967) is a member of the National Assembly of France.  He represents the Rhône department,  and is a member of The Republicans.

References

1967 births
Living people
Politicians from Clermont-Ferrand
The Republicans (France) politicians
Deputies of the 13th National Assembly of the French Fifth Republic